South of Scotland Enterprise  is the development agency for southern Scotland, covering the council areas of Scottish Borders and Dumfries and Galloway. It is an executive non-departmental public body of the Scottish Government, and was established in 2020, following the passage of the South of Scotland Enterprise Act 2019.

It is one of three development agencies in Scotland, operating alongside Scottish Enterprise (which covers the central belt and eastern Scotland), and Highlands and Islands Enterprise (which covers the northern and western parts of the country). The three agencies jointly operate Scottish Development International which exists to assist Scottish companies grow their export markets.

Its remit includes market research surveys, including its business panel survey, funding land development projects as well as tourism and heritage development.

References

External links
Official Website

Executive non-departmental public bodies of the Scottish Government
Dumfries and Galloway
Scottish Borders
Development agencies of Scotland
2020 establishments in Scotland
Government agencies established in 2020